The R-Type is a family of straight-4 turbocharged diesel engines developed by both Nissan and Renault, and also Daimler in regarding the R9M/OM626 engine. Released in 2011, it replaced the 1.9 dCi engine in Renault's range and the 2.0 dCi in the Nissan Qashqai, and in 2015, it also replaced the 2.0 dCi in the Renault Mégane as well. When launched, the engine produced . Renault later introduced a higher-powered twin-turbocharged variant producing .

Summary

R9M 130
R9M 130PS was introduced in 2011.

Developed within the framework of the Alliance, the newcomer's performance credentials were made similar to those of its predecessor, the 1.9 dCi 130 engine.
 
This new block came with a change in Renault's engine downsizing policy. More downsizing was to be obtained, thanks to the shortening of the stroke of the pistons and a redesign of the reciprocating parts. The cylinder's swept volume was reduced and thereby diminished the amount of fuel being burned during each cycle. Performance levels were maintained, however, by improving turbocharging efficiency.

Applications:
2011 - Renault Scénic
2011 - Nissan Qashqai
2012 - Renault Mégane
2013 - Renault Fluence
2014 - Mercedes Vito
2014 - Mercedes C Class 
2015 - Renault Kadjar
2016 - Renault Talisman

R9M 160
R9M 160 was launched in February 2011. It is twin-turbocharged, derived from the new Energy dCi 130. Peak torque  is available from 1,750 rpm.

Applications:
2011- Renault Captur Concept Car
2015- Renault Espace
2015- Renault Talisman

R9N 120
R9N 120 was launched in 2018

Developed within the framework of the Alliance, the newcomer's performance credentials are similar to those of its predecessor, the 1.9 dCi 130 engine.

Applications:
2018- Renault Scénic
2018- Renault Talisman

R9N 150
R9N 150 was launched in 2019

This engine was discontinued in 2021 alongside all other diesel engines in the cars of the Renault-Nissan alliance as part of their plan to stop developing and selling new diesel engines in their cars by 2021 in favor of hybrids and EVs.

Applications:
2018-2021 Renault Mégane
2018-2021 Renault Kadjar
2018-2021 Renault Talisman
2019-2021 Nissan Qashqai
2019-2021 Nissan X-Trail (Europe)

See also
Renault K-Type engine
List of Renault engines

References

Renault engines
Straight-four engines
Diesel engines by model